Andrew Everett Wenkel (born July 9, 1992) better known by the ring name Andrew Everett, is an American professional wrestler best known for his time in Impact Wrestling, where he was a former Impact World Tag Team Champion. He's also wrestling for several independent promotions, including Pro Wrestling Guerrilla (PWG) and Evolve Wrestling.

Professional wrestling career

Early career (2007−2015)
Everett's father was one of the co-founders of OMEGA Championship Wrestling along with Jeff Hardy and Matt Hardy, who helped train him. Everett has wrestled mostly on the independent circuit, appearing for promotions like OMEGA, Pro Wrestling Guerrilla (PWG), Combat Zone Wrestling (CZW), Global Force Wrestling (GFW) and Alternative Wrestling World (AWW). Internationally, Everett has wrestled for British promotion Revolution Pro Wrestling.

Impact Wrestling (2015–2018, 2022)
On October 4, 2015, at Bound for Glory, Everett made his Total Nonstop Action Wrestling (TNA) debut in an Ultimate X match for the TNA X Division Championship but fell short as the match was won by Tigre Uno.

In April 2016, he made his return as a heel, interrupting a match between Trevor Lee, Eddie Edwards and DJZ, helping Lee, forming the stable known as The Helms Dynasty with Trevor Lee and Gregory Shane Helms. At One Night Only: Victory Road 2016, Everett defeated DJZ with help from Lee and Helms. He would then compete in a four-way match at Slammiversary for the TNA X Division Championship, in a losing effort. On the June 28 episode of Impact Wrestling, he participated in a battle royal to be the number one contender for the X Division Championship, but was eliminated by the winner Braxton Sutter. On the July 5 episode of Impact Wrestling, he participated in an Ultimate X match for the X Division Championship, in a losing effort. At Destination X, he lost a ladder match to be the number one contender to the X Division Championship. On the October 6 episode of Impact Wrestling, Everett and Lee teamed with Marshe Rockett in a Team X Gold match against DJZ, Braxton Sutter and Mandrews in a losing effort.

On February 9, 2017, Everett was attacked by Trevor Lee and Gregory Shane Helms, kicking him out of the Helms Dynasty, turning him face in the process. On February 23, 2017, Everett ran down and saved DJZ from Lee and Helms. On the April 20 episode of Impact Wrestling, Lee lost the Impact Wrestling X Division Championship to Low Ki in a Six-Way match including Everett, Sonjay Dutt, Dezmond Xavier and Suicide.

On the July 6 episode of Impact Wrestling episode of Impact, Everett entered the 2017 GFW Super X Cup Tournament. On July 13, he was eliminated in the first round by A. C. H.

On the October 5 episode of Impact!, Everett joined the alliance of Trevor Lee and Caleb Konley, losing to the team of Sonjay Dutt, Petey Williams and Matt Sydal in a six-man tag team match, turning heel again in the process.

On April 24, 2018, DJ Z and Everett defeated Eli Drake and Scott Steiner to win the Impact World Tag Team Championship, turning Everett face again. On April 26, 2018, Everett nd DJZ lost the titles to The Latin American Xchange (Santana and Ortiz).

On May 25, Everett took part in the 2018 JT Lightning Invitational Tournament in Cleveland, Ohio, for Absolute Intense Wrestling. On Night 1 of the tournament, lost in the first to Jodi Fleish. On Night 2, Everett competed in a six-man scramble match featuring Gringo Loco, Cheech, Spyder Nate Webb, Louis Lyndon and Space Monkey. On September 18, Everett announced that he was granted his release from Impact Wrestling.

On June 19, 2022, Everett returned to Impact Wrestling, replacing an injured Jack Evans in the six-man Ultimate X match at Slammiversary for the Impact X Division Championship.

Championships and accomplishments
All American Wrestling
AAW Tag Team Championship (1 time) – with Trevor Lee
 CWF Mid-Atlantic
CWF Mid-Atlantic Tag Team Championship (1 time) – with Arik Royal
CWF Mid-Atlantic Rising Generation League Championship (1 time)
16th Annual Rumble (2016)
Deadlock Pro-Wrestling
DPW National Championship (1 time, current)
DPW Awards (1 time)
Match of the Year (2022) - 
Impact Wrestling
Impact World Tag Team Championship (1 time) - with DJZ
Lucha Libre AAA Worldwide
Best Match of the Night (2017) – with DJZ vs. Drago and Aerostar
 Premier Wrestling Federation
 PWF Unified Tag Team Championship (1 time) – with Colby Corino
Pro Wrestling Guerrilla
PWG World Tag Team Championship (1 time) – with Trevor Lee
DDT4 (2015) – with Trevor Lee
Pro Wrestling Illustrated
Ranked No. 78 of the top 500 singles wrestlers in the PWI 500 in 2017
Revolution Pro Wrestling
RPW British Cruiserweight Championship (1 time)
Pro Wrestling International
 PWI Ultra J Championship (4 times, current)
Southside Wrestling Entertainment
SWE Speed King Championship (1 time)

References

External links

 Andrew Everett on Impact Wrestling
 Andrew Everett on Twitter
 Andrew Everett on Instagram
 

1992 births
Living people
21st-century professional wrestlers
American male professional wrestlers
People from Burlington, North Carolina
Professional wrestlers from North Carolina
TNA/Impact World Tag Team Champions
PWG World Tag Team Champions
AAW Tag Team Champions
Undisputed British Cruiserweight Champions